Osvaldo Faustini (born 25 July 1956) is an Italian former long-distance runner.

Biography
Osvaldo Faustini has 5 caps in national team from 1983 to 1991. He is not relative of the other Italian marathon runner Alessio Faustini.

National titles
Osvaldo Faustini has won 2 times the individual national championship.
2 wins in Marathon (1985, 1986)

References

External links
 
 Osvaldo Faustini at Medagliedoro.org 

1956 births
Living people
Italian male long-distance runners
Italian male marathon runners
World Athletics Championships athletes for Italy
Athletics competitors of Fiamme Oro